Maria José Schuller (born 13 February 1965) is a Portuguese beach volleyball player. She competed in the women's tournament at the 2000 Summer Olympics.

References

1965 births
Living people
Portuguese women's beach volleyball players
Olympic beach volleyball players of Portugal
Beach volleyball players at the 2000 Summer Olympics
Place of birth missing (living people)